Mziiki, meaning music in Swahili, is an African music streaming App launched in mid-2014 by Spice VAS Africa. Its library has content from over 1,500 African artists who have signed up. It can play streaming music or cache songs for offline playback. Music can be browsed or searched by artist, album, genre, playlist, or record label. Mziiki's brand partners/ambassadors were named in mid 2014 as Kevin Wyre, a Kenyan dancehall music veteran and BET Awards 2014 nominee Diamond Platnumz

Mziiki also has a YouTube channel called mziikitube where it has compiled videos from its licenses artists

See also
 List of Internet radio stations
 List of online music databases
 Music Genome Project
 TuneIn

References

External links
 

Online music and lyrics databases
Kenyan music websites
Android (operating system) software
BlackBerry software
IOS software
Windows Phone software